Stephan von Dassel (born 1967) is a German politician for the Alliance 90/The Greens and since 2016 'Bezirksbürgermeister' (district mayor) of the Berlin borough of Mitte. He is not part of the historical noble family von Dassel.

Life and politics

Von Dassel was born 1967 in the westgerman city of Münster and studied politics at the Free University of Berlin. 
Von Dassel entered the Greens in the 80's and became Bezirksbürgermeister of Berlin-Mitte in 2016. 
He was reelected in September 2021.

References 

Living people
1967 births
German politicians
21st-century German politicians
People from Münster